The Mystkowski family – was one of several noble families using the Puchała coat-of-arms during the time of the Polish–Lithuanian Commonwealth. First mention of the Mystkowski family comes from the 'KODEKS DYPLOMATYCZNY KSIĘSTWA MAZOWIECKIEGO' or 'The Diplomatic Code of the Duchy of Mazovia'. In this book, mention is made of a Comes Thomas, the castellan of Nosylk, being granted the town of Myzlicow. Comes can be roughly translated as Count, while Nosylk is the modern-day city of Nasielsk. Myzlicow is the modern town of Mystkowo, which is considered to be the ancestral land of the Mystkowski family.

Unfortunately for the Polish nobility, during both world wars and the conquest of Poland by the USSR, most documents and other artifacts were destroyed.

Family members of note
 Kazimierz Wiesław Mystkowski (born 13 September 1958) Computer engineer, formerly married to Princess Maria of Romania, youngest daughter of former King Michael I of Romania and Princess Anne of Bourbon-Parma.
 Ignacy Mystkowski (born 4 February 1826 – died 13 May 1863) Lieutenant-Colonel with the Polish National Government revolutionary forces during the January Uprising.  Mystkowski won a major victory at the Battle of Stok.  He was later killed in action during the Battle of Kietlanka and was buried with full military honors.
 Tomasz Mystkowski- Progenitor of the Mystkowski family, comes (count) and castellan of Nasielsk in the service of Prince Bolesław II, Duke of Mazovia.

References
Shows the election of King Stanisław II August. In the Polish–Lithuanian Commonwealth only nobles were allowed to vote for the king.  It lists a Mystkowski as one of the voters.
Shows a list of noble families from Poland
Confederation of Polish Nobility
Mystkowski family website with genealogy included.  It mentions the Mystkowski-Romanov connection.
German book from the early 20th century listing recognized Polish noble families.  The Mystkowski family is mentioned twice, under both Jastrzębiec and Puchała coats of arms.
Polish noble families
Clan of Jastrzębiec
  Mention of Comes Thomas granted the town of Myzlicow in the year 1297.